Agnes of Poitou ( – 14 December 1077), was the queen of Germany from 1043 and empress of the Holy Roman Empire from 1046 until 1056 as the wife of Emperor Henry III. From 1056 to 1061, she ruled the Holy Roman Empire as regent during the minority of their son Henry IV.

After the death of her husband, she proved an inexperienced regent who made many disastrous mistakes. In Germany, she is still commemorated as a sympathetic historical figure, even if a flawed politician.

Early life

Agnes was the daughter of the Ramnulfid Duke William V of Aquitaine (d. 1030) and Agnes of Burgundy and as such a member of the Ramnulfid family.

Empress

Agnes married King Henry III of Germany in November 1043 at the Imperial Palace Ingelheim. She was his second wife after Gunhilda of Denmark, who had died, possibly from malaria, in 1038. This marriage helped to solidify the Empire's relationships with the princely houses in the west. King Henry was able to improve his position versus the French royal dynasty and to exert his influence in the Duchy of Burgundy. Agnes, like her husband, was of profound piety; her family had founded Cluny Abbey and Abbot Hugh the Great was godfather of her son Henry IV.

Regency
After her husband's death on 5 October 1056, Empress Agnes served as regent on behalf of her young son Henry IV. Henry III had secured the election of his son as King of the Romans on his deathbed. Agnes, aided by Hugh of Cluny and Pope Victor II, also bishop of Eichstätt, tried to continue her husband's politics and to reinforce the rule of the Salian dynasty. However, despite being related to kings of Italy and Burgundy, she was a controversial leader. The loss of ancestral lands later weakened her son's position tremendously.

After Henry's death, Agnes was stuck in a difficult position between secular and religious powers. She had support from her retinue and gifts she brought from France, and she wanted to follow the example of Empress Adelheid. She was however more restricted than the Ottonian queen-empresses.

In order to forge alliances, she gave away three German duchies: already on Christmas 1056, the Ezzonid scion Conrad III, a nephew of Count palatine Ezzo of Lotharingia, received the Duchy of Carinthia. The next year she enfeoffed Rudolf of Rheinfelden with Swabia, appointed him administrator of Burgundy and offered him the hand of her daughter Matilda. According to the medieval chronicler Frutolf of Michelsberg, Rudolf had possibly abducted her and extorted the betrothment. However, the late Henry III had promised the Swabian duchy to Berthold of Zähringen, who in turn had to be compensated with Carinthia upon Conrad's death in 1061.

At the same time, while German forces interfered in the fratricidal struggle of King Andrew I and Béla I of Hungary, Agnes ceded the Duchy of Bavaria to Count Otto of Nordheim. He reached a settlement with Hungary by enforcing the coronation of Andrew's son Solomon but later became a bitter rival of her son Henry IV.

Though initially a follower of the Cluniac Reforms, Agnes opposed the contemporary papal reform movement, and took the side of Italian dissidents who did as well. Things had worsened after the death of Pope Victor II in 1057: his successor Stephen IX, who was unable to take actual possession of Rome due to the Roman aristocracy's election of an antipope, Benedict X, sent Hildebrand of Sovana and Anselm of Lucca (respectively, the future Popes Gregory VII and Alexander II) to Germany to obtain recognition from dowager empress Agnes in her role as regent.

Though Stephen died before being able to return to Rome, Agnes' help was instrumental in letting Hildebrand depose the antipope  and with Agnes' support replace him by the bishop of Florence, Nicholas II. However, on Easter 1059 Nicholas issued the papal bull In nomine Domini establishing the cardinals as the sole electors of the pope, detrimental to the interests of the emperor and the temporal empire.

When Pope Alexander II was elected on 30 September 1061, Empress Agnes refused to acknowledge him and had Honorius II elected. This schism did not end until Pentecost 1064. The empress' candidate could not prevail against the Roman Curia; in consequence, Agnes retired from politics, leaving the regency to her confidant Bishop Henry II of Augsburg.

Bishop Henry did not receive wide acceptance due to his awkward and haughty manners, not least with a view to rumours about his relationship with the empress as rendered by the chronicler Lambert of Hersfeld . Moreover, the fact that the heir to the throne was raised by common ministeriales led to anger with the princes. In 1062, young Henry IV was abducted by a group of men, including Archbishop Anno II of Cologne and Otto of Nordheim, in a conspiracy to remove Agnes from the throne, referred to as the Coup of Kaiserswerth. Henry was brought to Cologne, and despite jumping overboard from a board to escape, he was recaptured. From this point, the power shifted to Rome, as the pope elected the emperor.

Agnes resigned as regent, as ransom, and Anno together with the archbishops Siegfried of Mainz and Adalbert of Bremen took her place.

Later life
According to Frutolf of Michelsberg Agnes retired to Fruttuaria Abbey after the coup. When Henry IV reached the age of majority, Agnes moved to Rome where her arrival in 1065 is documented by Peter Damian. Agnes went on to act as a mediator and peacemaker between her son and the papacy. She died in Rome on 14 December 1077 and is buried at St. Peter's Basilica.

Personality
Agnes was a reserved and gentle woman. She lacked the sternness and imposing qualities that characterized successful Ottonian and Salian queen-empresses like Matilda, Adelaide, Theophanu, Kunigunde and Gisela, though.

Legacy
Agnes is a featured figure on Judy Chicago's installation piece The Dinner Party, being represented as one of the 999 names on the Heritage Floor.

Issue
Agnes and Henry's children were:
Adelaide II (1045, Goslar – 11 January 1096), abbess of Gandersheim from 1061 and Quedlinburg from 1063
Gisela (1047, Ravenna – 6 May 1053)
Matilda (October 1048 – 12 May 1060, Pöhlde), married 1059 Rudolf of Rheinfelden, duke of Swabia and antiking (1077)
Henry, his successor
Conrad II (1052, Regensburg – 10 April 1055), Duke of Bavaria (from 1054)
Judith (1054, Goslar – 14 March 1092 or 1096), married firstly 1063 Solomon of Hungary and secondly 1089 Ladislaus I Herman, Duke of Poland

Notes

References

Sources

 Chicago, Judy. The Dinner Party: From Creation to Preservation. London: Merrell (2007). 
Robinson, I. S. Henry IV of Germany 1056–1106, 2000
Women and Power in the Middle Ages: Political Aspects of Medieval Queenship PDF of an article from an unknown book, lacks footnote information.
 

|-

|-

House of Poitiers
Holy Roman Empresses
Duchesses of Swabia
1020s births
Year of birth uncertain
Place of birth unknown
1077 deaths
Burials at St. Peter's Basilica
11th-century women rulers
11th-century viceregal rulers
11th-century Italian nobility
11th-century Italian women
11th-century women of the Holy Roman Empire
11th-century German women
Abbey of Fruttuaria
Queen mothers